Colonel Abdulahi Sheik Ismael (Fara-Tag) is a commander in the army of the Transitional Federal Government (TFG) of the Republic of Somalia.

He was militia chief commander of the Juba Valley Alliance (JVA) before it folded under the command of the TFG, serving under Barre Adan Shire Hiiraale before and after the merger of forces.

On October 6, 2006, vowed to retake Kismayo after its abandonment to the Islamic Courts Union (ICU), but their counterattacks at the time failed. JVA officials in Jilib were also reported arrested by the ICU.

On October 22, SomaliNet reported Col. Ismael Fara-Tag was claimed to have been captured and knifed to death after the fall of the town of Bu'aale to the ICU. However, on November 4, these reports proved false when Col. Fara-Tag was reported alive and well in Bardhere.

On November 5, there were reports of the "unlocking" (presumably, the beginning) of training of 1,300 Ahlu Suna Wal Jama'a clerics in Bardhere to fight on behalf of the JVA/TFG. These recruits were to replace the losses suffered by the JVA in October. The number began as 700, but rapidly increased to 1,300. Col. Fara-Tag was reported to explain, "They are volunteers attending to defend their territory from the invasion of foreigners alongside the Islamic courts."

On December 19, Col. Fara-Tag was named as the commander of the TFG forces defending Bardhere from attack. However, the ICU collapsed after that in the course of the Battle of Baidoa, and Bardhere never fell to them.

References

Living people
Somalian military leaders
Ethnic Somali people
Year of birth missing (living people)